The Lord's Pavilion is a cricket pavilion at Lord's Cricket Ground in London, England. Designed by Thomas Verity and built in 1889–1890, the pavilion has achieved Grade II* listed heritage designation. Like the rest of Lord's, the pavilion is owned by Marylebone Cricket Club (MCC) but is also used by Middlesex County Cricket Club and the England national cricket team.

History 
The current pavilion was opened in 1890 at a cost of £21,000 after the original pavilion was destroyed by fire.

Until 1999 women – except Queen Elizabeth II – were not permitted to enter the pavilion as members during play, due to the gender-based membership policy of MCC. The 1998 decision to allow female MCC members represented a historic modernisation of the pavilion and its clubs. In 1986 Diana Edulji was refused entry to the pavilion while captaining India on their tour of England. She quipped that the MCC should change its name to MCP ("male chauvinist pigs").

In 2004, the pavilion was closed for a major refurbishment costing £8.2 million.  The pavilion seating was extended to the upper levels and certain historic areas, such as the Long Room, were refurbished and redecorated.

The only batsman to hit a ball over the top of the pavilion has been Albert Trott in 1889. In 2010, Somerset County Cricket Club captain, Marcus Trescothick was reportedly offered £1 million to hit a six over the pavilion.

Rules 
The dress code in the pavilion is notoriously strict. Men are required to wear "ties and tailored coats and acceptable trousers with appropriate shoes" and women are required to wear "dresses; or skirts or trousers worn with blouses, and appropriate shoes".

Features

Dressing rooms
The pavilion houses dressing rooms designated for home and away teams. Each dressing room has its own balcony, from which players waiting to bat, or other team personnel can watch the progress of the game.

Honours boards

If a player manages to score a century or take five wickets in a Test match innings, their names are placed on the Lord's honours board, located in the dressing rooms. England players' achievements are recorded on boards in the home dressing room and all other nationalities in the away dressing room. Several notable players, such as Shane Warne, Sachin Tendulkar, Brian Lara, Ricky Ponting, Curtly Ambrose have failed to qualify to have their names placed on the honours board.

Long Room

The Long Room, described as "The most evocative four walls in world cricket", is a feature of the Pavilion, a room players walk through on their way from the dressing rooms to the middle. The walk from dressing room to cricket field at Lord's is notoriously long and complex. On his Test debut in 1975, David Steele got lost "and ended up in the pavilion's basement toilets".

The Long Room is lined with paintings of famous cricketers and administrators, from the 18th century to the 21st. Members of MCC and their guests have free access to the room (there are windows with views of the ground) and will often greet Australian batsmen walking out to bat with "witticisms ... like 'See you soon'". On this point, Australian Justin Langer, described walking through the Long Room like "being bearhugged by an invisible spirit".

Sightscreens
The Lord's pavilion includes four movable sightscreens, which move on wheels, to allow batsmen to adjust for different angles of bowling.

References 

Grade II* listed buildings in the City of Westminster
English cricket in the 19th century
Tourist attractions in London
Cricket in London
Buildings and structures completed in 1890
Lord's